Cheltenham is a suburb in Melbourne, Victoria, Australia, 18 km south-east of Melbourne's Central Business District, located within the Cities of Bayside and Kingston local government areas. Cheltenham recorded a population of 23,992 at the 2021 census.

Cheltenham is currently undergoing significant gentrification and development. The eastern side of the area's metropolitan railway line and Charman Road north is located within the City of Kingston, while the suburb's western region towards extensive golf links, parks and Port Phillip Bay falls within the City of Bayside.

A significant feature in Cheltenham is Westfield Southland, a major shopping centre which opened in 1968.

History

The Boon Wurrung people had used natural springs in the area and when European settlers arrived they established market gardens and orchards nearby.

Cheltenham was one of the earliest areas to be settled in the parish of Moorabbin. It initially consisted of 625 acres of land purchased at auction by Josiah Morris Holloway on 11 May 1852. He subdivided this land into 370 allotments that were offered for sale in 1853. Many of the blocks were two acres in size and this gave the community its first name, Two Acre Village.

Lot 13 was purchased by Charles Whorrell for £20 and was located on the corner of Schnapper Point Road (Nepean Highway) and Centre Dandenong Road. On the allotment he built a hotel, the Cheltenham Inn, named after his home town in England, and a publican's license was granted in 1854. It was probably the first public building in the community and is believed to have given its name to the settlement. It later became a coffee palace before being demolished in the 1930s. Another pub, the Armagh Hotel (Royal Oak), had been built on Schnapper Point Road by 1856. A third pub, the Exchange Hotel (Tudor Inn) had been built nearby on the highway by 1871. By 1880, a fortnightly sale of livestock and produce took place behind the hotel.

Sufficient population had settled for a Post Office to open on 1 August 1857. The community had a medical practitioner by November 1857, Dr Richard Goldstone (1802-1888). A Mechanics' Institute was opened in January 1865, with a Temperance Hall attached that could accommodate 300 people.

Local government began with the creation of the Moorabbin Roads Board in 1862. This became the Moorabbin Shire Council in 1871. Which in turn became the City of Moorabbin in October 1934. This became the City of Kingston in 1994 following a program of municipal amalgamations initiated by the state government. Cheltenham is the largest suburb in the municipality in terms of size and population and it contains the seat of local government.

Cheltenham Park dates to 1872, and was used for cricket and other recreational activities. In all, Cheltenham contains 13 parks that make up 5.3% of the suburb.

The area experienced a spurt of growth in the 1880s after the Cheltenham railway station opened in 1881. A branch of the English, Scottish and Australian Bank opened in 1885.
It was a substantial brick building on the corner of Nepean Highway and Goulburn St. It was still in use as a bank till the 1960s.

Much residential development occurred in the second half of the 1940s after World War II ended and this growth continued into the 1980s. The growing population of the area saw the construction of the Southland shopping centre on Nepean Highway in the mid 1960s. Cheltenham also has a large industrial area on the eastern edge and a smaller area at the far western edge. The western area is noted for Melbourne's only lift test shaft.

In 1993, the landmark 7-storey 1230 Nepean Highway office tower was built.  The City of Kingston leased spaced within the building for use as its main office before purchasing it in 2010.

Population

In the 2016 Census, there were 22,291 people in Cheltenham. 66.6% of people were born in Australia. The next most common countries of birth were England 3.9%, China 2.8%, India 2.2%, Greece 2.2% and New Zealand 1.6%. 72.4% of people spoke only English at home. Other languages spoken at home included Greek 4.8%, Mandarin 3.1%, Russian 1.7%, Italian 1.5% and Hindi 0.8%. The most common responses for religion were No Religion 34.2%, Catholic 23.6% and Anglican 10.3%.

Health

The Kingston centre is a large aged care and rehabilitation facility which opened on Warrigal Road, Cheltenham, in 1911 as the Melbourne Benevolent Asylum. It was known as the Cheltenham Home and Hospital for the Aged from 1965 through to 1970, before it was renamed to the Kingston Centre.The Heatherton Sanatorium with its entrance on Kingston Road (Heatherton, Victoria) is a now defunct sanatorium located behind the Kingston Centre and it operated for nearly 85 years, before it was closed in 1998.

In 2010, The Kingston Centre underwent a $46.3-million redevelopment, which was opened on 11 May 2012.

Education
There are six schools in the suburb of Cheltenham; five of which focus on Primary education with the remaining one focusing on Secondary education. They are:
 Cheltenham Secondary College, (1959)
 Cheltenham Primary School, (1855)
 Cheltenham East Primary School, (1956)
 Le Page Primary School, (1994)
 Kingston Heath Primary School, (1976)
 Our Lady of the Assumption Parish Primary School, (1951)

Le Page Primary School was formed as a result of the merger of former primary schools Cheltenham Heights Primary School and Cheltenham North Primary School in 1994.

The Cheltenham Community and Education Centre is located at 8 Chesterville Road, Cheltenham. They offer English as a Second Language (ESL) classes, courses, childcare facilities and workshops.

Sport
Cheltenham is home to sporting facilities and clubs. Sports played in the area include soccer, golf, cricket, Australian rules football, lawn bowls, baseball and swimming. There are a number of golf courses in Cheltenham; Cheltenham Golf Club on Victor Avenue which has nine holes however can be played as an eighteen-hole course from different tee boxes, Sandringham Municipal Golf Links on Cheltenham Road, and the Victoria Golf Club on Park Road

The suburb has two Australian Rules football teams. The Rosellas compete in the Southern Football League, as well as the Panthers who compete in the South Metro Junior Football League

Cheltenham Football and Cricket Clubs are based in Weatherall Road. The Cricket Club was established in 1872, originally in the Frankston-Glenhuntly Cricket Association, and migrating to the Federal District Cricket Association where the junior sides still play. The three senior sides now play in Cricket Southern Bayside.

Bentleigh Greens Soccer Club's senior team play in the National Premier Leagues Victoria which is the top tier in Victoria. Their home ground is the Kingston Heath Soccer Complex.

Shopping
Cheltenham is home to the shopping centre Westfield Southland, located in the northern part of the suburb. When it opened in 1968 it featured a small number of "anchor tenants", such as Myer and Woolworths, and dozens of smaller retailers, banks and cafes. Since its opening, the shopping centre has been continually expanded and renovated over the years. One such development was the construction of multi-level retail bridge across Nepean Highway linking to a newer three-level extension near the railway line. Southland now features up to 416 stores including 3 department stores, 3 discount department stores, 3 supermarkets, 3 electrical retailers and a 16 screen Village Cinemas Multiplex.

Many new retail outlets have popped up in Cheltenham in recent years, most notably DFO Moorabbin, which is located adjacent to Moorabbin Airport. DFO was originally built in 1992 as Fairways Market, and it is a large shopping centre that contains up to 135 stores, mainly fashion outlets.

Kingston Central Plaza, situated next to DFO, is also a new shopping precinct, which opened in 2008 and has 10 stores including: The Good Guys, Aldi and Sam's Warehouse.

Cheltenham Shopping centre is located in the centre of Cheltenham, on Charman Road. It is a large shopping strip that has a mixture of retail, residential buildings and offices. Local hotspot, The Garden of Good & Evil, is a popular venue serving tapas and drinks until late, 7 nights a week.

A farmers market is held on the first Saturday of each month on parkland near the intersection of Nepean Highway and Bay Road.

Places of worship
There are a number of religious organisations and places of worship in Cheltenham, including Anglican, Church of Christ, Uniting, Presbyterian, Roman Catholic and Pentecostal/Charismatic Christian churches.

Cemeteries
The Cheltenham Pioneers Cemetery is located in Charman Road, next to the railway station, and was established in October 1864. The cemetery has many of Cheltenham's most distinguished inhabitants. There are also many memorials to some of Cheltenham's youngest inhabitants, such as the many unnamed babies from the nearby Children's Home (the site is now occupied by Westfield Southland Shopping centre) who died as a result of disease early in the 20th century.

Most burials now take place at the Cheltenham Memorial Park, located on Reserve Road, which was established in 1933.

Transport

The suburb has been serviced by Cheltenham railway station since December 1881, which is located on the Frankston line, alongside Charman Road. In 2017 an additional railway station opened in Cheltenham's north; Southland railway station adjacent to the busy shopping centre of the same name, Westfield Southland shopping complex. Bus routes also service the suburb, mainly focusing on the large Westfield Southland Shopping centre complex, Warrigal Road (Highway) to the far east, Park Road to the north and Centre Dandenong Road around the suburb's geographic centre.

In 2020 the Victorian government completely rebuilt Cheltenham train station and removed two level crossings in the suburb.

Library services
The Cheltenham branch of the City of Kingston Library is located 12 Stanley Avenue, Cheltenham.

Activity Centres
Cheltenham is one of 82 higher order Major Activity Centres identified by the Melbourne 2030 growth planning policy. Although the growth planning policy was scrapped by the Victorian coalition government in April 2011, some elements of the policy still remain, including activity centres. Development of Cheltenham's Major Activity Centre, which is within 400m of Cheltenham railway station, 
is to be completed by 2030.

Southland is one of 28 Principal Activity Centre's located adjacent to the Highett Activity Centre and the Cheltenham Activity Centre. The activity centre's main focal point is Westfield Southland shopping complex.

Politics
In terms of State and Federal Government, Cheltenham is situated in the Electoral district of Clarinda, Bentleigh and Sandringham for state parliament and the Electoral district of Goldstein and Isaacs in the federal system.

In the 2018 and 2022 Victorian State elections and the 2019 Australian Federal Election, every booth in Cheltenham reported a two-party majority of votes for the Labor Party.

State parliamentarians

Federal parliamentarians

As of 2021, Cheltenham is split between ‘Wattle Ward’ ‘Karkarook Ward’ and ‘Chicquita Ward’ in the City of Kingston, currently represented by Jenna Davey-Burns, Hadi Saab and Tracey Davies.

Cheltenham, Victoria, is a "twin town" with six other Cheltenham's around the world:
 Cheltenham, England
 Cheltenham Township, Pennsylvania, United States
 Cheltenham, Ontario, Canada
 Cheltenham, St. Louis, Missouri, United States
 Cheltenham, New South Wales, Australia
 Cheltenham, Auckland, New Zealand

Notable residents

 Albert Allnutt – farmer and politician
 Vera Scantlebury Brown – medical practitioner
 James Cuthbertson – poet
 David Davies – artist
 Charles French – entomologist
 Sir William Fry – politician
 Hermann Herlitz – pastor
 Sir Robert Jackson – UN administrator
 Allan Jeans – football coach
 Henry Kane – schoolmaster
 Hattie Leckie – journalist
 Stella Power – soprano
 Joyce Vickery – botanist
 Bob Wilkie – footballer

See also
 City of Moorabbin – Parts of Cheltenham were previously within this former local government area.
 City of Sandringham – Parts of Cheltenham were previously within this former local government area.
 City of Bayside – current local government area
 City of Kingston – current local government area
 Cheltenham Football Club
 Cheltenham railway station
 Cheltenham Secondary College
 DFO Moorabbin
 Kingston Heath Soccer Complex
 Pennydale, Victoria - Neighbourhood of Cheltenham
 Southland railway station
 Westfield Southland

References

External links
Bayside City Council Website
Australian Places - Cheltenham
Cheltenham Cricket Club
Cheltenham Football Club
Cheltenham East Primary School

Suburbs of Melbourne
Suburbs of the City of Bayside
Suburbs of the City of Kingston (Victoria)
1852 establishments in Australia
Populated places established in 1852